Chains of Love may refer to:

Music
 "Chains of Love" (Erasure song) (1988)
 "Chains of Love" (Ahmet Ertegun song), a song popularized by Big Joe Turner and Pat Boone
 "Chains of Love" (Mickey Gilley song) (1977)
 "Chains of Love" (Terry Ronald song) (1991)
 "Chains of Love", a 1967 song by J.J. Barnes

Other uses
 Chains of Love (TV series), a 2001 American reality television series